A natural bobtail is an animal's tail which due to a mutated gene grows unusually short or is missing completely. The genes for the shortened tail may be dominant or recessive.

Because of legislation restricting or preventing docking, natural bobtails are growing in popularity among the dog fancy for some traditionally docked breeds.  For example, one Boxer breeder and geneticist in England has successfully petitioned the Kennel Club for permission to cross Corgis into his lines and then backcross to Boxers, introducing the gene into his lines.  This would have been unheard of in decades past. A number of these bobtail Boxers have been exported to various countries around the world.

However in some breeds, such as the Rottweiler, natural bobtails are not universally accepted in the Country of Origin Breed Standard.

Animals with a natural bobtail

Cats

More than one gene is responsible for tail suppression in cats; research is incomplete, but it is known that the Japanese Bobtail and related breeds have a different mutation from that found in the Manx and its derivatives.
American Bobtail
Japanese Bobtailtails are short and kinked, but not entirely absent
Karelian Bobtailtails are short and kinked, but not entirely absent
Korean Bobtailtails are short and kinked, but not entirely absent
Kurilian Bobtail
Manx, and Cymric or Manx Longhair; tails range from full to entirely absent
Mekong Bobtail, a variant of the Siamese
Pixie-bob

Experimental breeds (mostly cross-breeds of the above):
Alpine Lynx cat
American Lynx cat
Desert Lynx cat
Highlander cat
Owyhee Bob

Dogs
A mutation in a gene called the T-box transcription factor T gene (C189G) accounts for natural bobtails in 21 dog breeds, but not in another 5 breeds, for which the genetic mechanism is yet to be determined.

One study found 17 of 23 newly studied breeds had the gene, in addition the Pembroke Welsh Corgi identified in previous research.  This study counted Rottweilers as not as not having the C189G gene, but tested only five Rottweilers, only two of which were short-tailed dogs.  Another study showed that Rottweilers do carry the gene, and Dobermanns (not tested by the earlier study) do as well.   

Although the following dogs may present a natural bobtail, the C189G mutation often appeared after decades or centuries of docking, which is considered in many countries, unnecessary, painful, cruel or mutilation. Today, many countries ban cropping and docking	

Breeds that can present C189G mutation:
			

Australian Shepherd
Austrian Pinscher
Australian Stumpy Tail Cattle Dog
Braque du Bourbonnais (Bourbonnais Pointer)
Braque Francais (Savoy Sheepdog)
Brazilian Terrier
Brittany
Croatian Sheepdog 
Danish–Swedish Farmdog
Dobermann 
Donggyeongi
English Shepherd
Jack Russell Terrier
Karelian Bear Dog
Mountain Cur
Mudi
Pembroke Welsh Corgi
Polish Lowland Sheepdog
Pyrenean Shepherd
Rottweiler 
Schipperke
Spanish Water Dog
Swedish Vallhund
Breeds without C189G mutation and presenting natural bobtail:
Boston Terrier     
English Bulldog     
Dog breeds into which the C189G mutation has been introduced by cross-breeding:
Boxer

Dog breeds where natural bobtails have not yet been tested for C189G mutation:

Entlebucher Mountain Dog
French Bulldog
Hmong bobtail dog
McNab
Miniature Fox Terrier
Old English Sheepdog
Rat Terrier
Tenterfield Terrier
Breeds in this sub-list often have full tails.

References

5. https://www.orivet.com/store/canine-trait/natural-bob-tail-short-tail-phenotype-

6. https://www.animalnetwork.com.au/tests/index.php?testid=14

7.http://www.vetbook.org/wiki/dog/index.php/Natural_bob_tail
Dog anatomy
Felidae anatomy